General elections were held in Montserrat in November 1978. The result was a victory for the People's Liberation Movement (PLM), which won all seven seats in the Legislative Council. PLM leader John Osborne became Chief Minister.

Campaign
A total of 18 candidates contested the elections; both the PLM and the ruling Progressive Democratic Party nominated seven candidates, with four independents also running.

Results

Elected MPs

References

Elections in Montserrat
Montserrat
General election
Montserratian general election
Montserrat